Doo Lough is a freshwater lake in the west of Ireland. It is located in southwest County Mayo on the Murrisk peninsula.

Geography
The lake runs in a narrow northwest to southeast direction, and is overlooked by the long ridge of Ben Lugmore , on its southwest shores, and by Barrclashcame  on its northeast shores. At its southeast head, lies the massif of Ben Gorm .

A notable feature on its northwestern head it the deep corrie of Lug More (or ), from which the Glencullin River feeds into the neighboring Lough Glencullin (the bottom of the corrie is also called the Glencullin valley).  Surrounding the corrie is the long ridge of Ben Lugmore and its several subsidiary summits, Ben Lugmore East Top , and Ben Lugmore West Top ; while cutting across the headwall (from bottom left to upper right), is grenn grassy feature known as The Ramp, which is used by climbers to gain the ridge of Ben Lugmore from the shores of Doo Lough.

Hydrology
Doo Lough is one of a set of connected lakes near Delphi. Glencullin Lough flows into Doo Lough, which in turn flows into Fin Lough via the Owengarr River. Fin Lough in turn drains into Killary Harbour via the Bundorragha River.

Natural history
Fish species in Doo Lough include brown trout, sea trout, perch, salmon, Arctic char, three-spined stickleback and the critically endangered European eel. The lake is part of the Mweelrea/Sheeffry/Erriff Complex Special Area of Conservation.

Famine memorial

The northern end of Doo Lough is the site of a stone Celtic cross which was erected as a memorial to the 1849 Doolough Tragedy.

Gallery

See also

List of loughs in Ireland

References

Doo